The 2012 Oberstaufen Cup was a professional tennis tournament played on clay courts. It was the 21st edition of the tournament which was part of the 2012 ATP Challenger Tour. It took place in Oberstaufen, Germany between 23 and 29 July 2012.

Singles main draw entrants

Seeds

 1 Rankings are as of July 16, 2012.

Other entrants
The following players received wildcards into the singles main draw:
  Daniel Baumann
  Robin Kern
  Bastian Knittel
  Kevin Krawietz

The following players received entry from the qualifying draw:
  Antoine Benneteau
  Andrei Dăescu
  Nils Langer
  Marek Semjan

Champions

Singles

 Dominik Meffert def.  Nils Langer, 6–4, 6–3

Doubles

 Andrei Dăescu /  Florin Mergea def.  Andrey Kuznetsov /  Jose Rubin Statham, 7–6(7–4), 7–6(7–1)

External links
Official website

Oberstaufen Cup
Oberstaufen Cup
2012 in German tennis